is a Japanese football player for SC Sagamihara on loan from Nagoya Grampus.

Career
After being raised by Nagoya Grampus U-18, Kajiyama was promoted to the top team in 2017 and then loaned to SC Sagamihara in September 2018.

Club statistics
Updated to 3 September 2018.

References

External links

Profile at J. League
Profile at Nagoya Grampus

1998 births
Living people
Association football people from Niigata Prefecture
Japanese footballers
J1 League players
J2 League players
J3 League players
Nagoya Grampus players
SC Sagamihara players
Association football midfielders